Kang Yu-jeong (born 2 August 1996) is a South Korean judoka. She represented South Korea at the 2020 Summer Olympics in Tokyo, Japan. She competed in the women's 48 kg event.

She subsequently attended . , she represented the Suncheon City Hall team in domestic competition. She is the silver medallist of the 2018 Judo Grand Slam Paris in the -48 kg category.

In 2021, she competed in the women's 48 kg event at the 2021 World Judo Championships held in Budapest, Hungary.

References

External links
 

1996 births
Living people
South Korean female judoka
Judoka at the 2020 Summer Olympics
Olympic judoka of South Korea
21st-century South Korean women